Gertrude Contemporary is a contemporary art complex located in Melbourne, Australia.

The organisation was founded in 1985 and is located at 21-31 High St, Preston South.  It also has a satellite exhibition space, Gertrude Glasshouse, at 44 Glasshouse Rd, Collingwood. The gallery was previously located in the suburb of Fitzroy.

Gertrude Contemporary's programs include exhibitions across the two gallery sites, studio residencies for local and international artists and education and public programs.  The Gertrude Contemporary Studio Program hosts 16 artists for a period of two years.

The current Co-Directors of Gertrude Contemporary are Mark Feary, Artistic Director, and Tracy Burgess, Executive Director. Previous Directors of the organisation are Alexie Glass-Kantor, Emma Crimmings, Louise Neri, Rose Lang, Max Delany and Samantha Comte.

History 
Gertrude Contemporary was established in 1983 as series of artist studios at 200 Gertrude Street, Fitzroy in a converted textiles factory. In 1985 it led the way as Australia’s first combined gallery and studio complex, a model it continues to operate today. First established under the name of 200 Gertrude Street, from the outset the organisation was dedicated to the production and presentation of experimental and contemporary art.

In July 2017, Gertrude Contemporary relocated its primary venue to 21-31 High Street, Preston South, converting a furniture warehouse into a combined studio and gallery complex. Gertrude Glasshouse, the organisation's satellite venue, opened at 44 Glasshouse Road, Collingwood, in 2015.

References

External links
Official website
Gertrude CAS Artabase page
Timeout -  Best free art galleries in Melbourne
Sydney Morning Herald - Move to new location

Art museums and galleries in Melbourne
Art galleries established in 1985
1985 establishments in Australia